The Assembly of Extremadura (Spanish: Asamblea de Extremadura; also called Parlamento de Extremadura) is the elected unicameral legislature of the Autonomous Community of Extremadura.

The electoral period is four years.

The Assembly of Extremadura is seated at the old Hospital of San Juan de Dios, in Mérida, the capital of the autonomous community. The session room features a 5th-century mosaic found in 1978 near the Roman Theatre.

References

External links 

 
1983 establishments in Extremadura
Extremadura